For the swimming competitions at the 2016 Summer Paralympics, the following qualification systems are in place. Qualification ends on July 3, 2016.

Allocation of Qualification Slots

An NPC can be allocated a maximum of thirty-four male qualification slots and a maximum of twenty-eight female qualification slots for a maximum total of sixty-two qualification slots per NPC. Exceptions may be granted through the Bipartite Invitation Commission Allocation method.

The qualification slot is allocated to the NPC not to the individual athlete. In case of a Bipartite Commission Invitation the slot is allocated to the individual athlete not to the NPC.

To ensure all medal events on the program are viable at the Rio 2016 Paralympic Games IPC Swimming reserves the right to allocate slots to the exclusive use of certain sport classes, in particular for athletes with high support needs. The slot shall be used as allocated or the NPC must return the slot.

An NPC can enter a maximum of three eligible athletes per medal event. NPCs can enter their athletes who have met at least one minimum qualification standard (MQS) in an unlimited number of further medal events as long as they have met the Minimum Entry Time (MET) for each of these additional events.

NPCs can enter a maximum of one team in each relay event as long as the MQS for the relay has been met. All team members must have qualified in at least one individual event to be selected as part of the relay-team.

Qualification system 

Qualification slots will be allocated as follows:

Quotas achieved
The following Quota Places have been gained at the time of writing (September 2015) through performances at the 2015 IPC Swimming World Championships.

References

Qualification